No. 571 Squadron RAF was a Second World War Royal Air Force pathfinder squadron operating the de Havilland Mosquito.

History
The squadron was formed on 7 April 1944 at RAF Downham Market, Norfolk to operate the de Havilland Mosquito XVI as part of the No. 8 (Pathfinder) Group. The main squadron role was to carry out independent raids on German industrial targets using 4,000 lb (1,814 kg) "Cookie" bombs. The squadron moved to RAF Oakington on 22 April 1944 and then, after having flown its last operational mission on 26/27 April 1945, to RAF Warboys on 20 July 1945. No. 571 Squadron was disbanded at Warboys on 20 September 1945.

The squadron carried out 2,681 operational sorties with the Mosquito with a loss of 8 aircraft.

Aircraft operated

Squadron bases

Commanding officers

References

Notes

Bibliography

External links

 571 Squadron history on old MOD site
 very short 571 Squadron history on new MOD site
 squadron histories for nos. 541–598 sqn on RafWeb's Air of Authority – A History of RAF Organisation

571 Squadron
Aircraft squadrons of the Royal Air Force in World War II
Military units and formations established in 1944